"Act Up" is a song by American hip hop duo City Girls from their debut studio album Girl Code (2018). It reached the top 40 on the US Billboard Hot 100. The song was released to US rhythmic and urban contemporary radio in as the album's second single March 27, 2019, eventually reaching number one on Billboards Rhythmic Songs chart in its July 6, 2019 issue. It has peaked at number 26 on the Hot 100, making it their highest charting entry.

The song received significant media attention after it was revealed that rapper Lil Yachty wrote most of the song. The song is sampled in "Hot Girl Summer" by Megan Thee Stallion featuring Nicki Minaj and Ty Dolla Sign, as well as "Midnight Hour" by Skrillex, Boys Noize, and Ty Dolla Sign.

Other versions
American rapper DaBaby released a freestyle rap of the song on March 26, 2019

As well as that the girls former makeup artist  Saucy Santana did a freestyle over the beat of the song on the cityboyz SoundCloud account

Music video
The music video for was released on City Girls' YouTube/VEVO page on May 30, 2019. It was one of several videos JT does not appear in, as she was serving a prison sentence after having been convicted of aggravated identity theft on fraudulent credit card charges. The video is set in Miami Beach, and co-stars Lil Yachty, who plays a news anchorman.

Charts

Weekly charts

Year-end charts

Certifications

Release history

References

2018 songs
2019 singles
City Girls songs
Songs written by Lil Yachty
Capitol Records singles